Mozez Praiz is a Nigerian model and a sports TV/radio presenter who currently works under SuperSport and Smooth F.M 98.1. Best known to be the host of Star Football Superfans Show and the anchor of Naija Made, Mozez has covered several sporting events including the 2010 Africa Cup of Nations in Angola and the 2010 FIFA World Cup in South Africa.

Mozez Praiz is also part of a stellar cast of Neil Andrews, Chisom Mbonu-Ezeoke, Wofai Fada and Chuey Chu on the number one sports betting show on the continent; Most Valuable Picks, airing on SuperSport.

Early life and education
Mozez was born into a family of nine in Lagos State, South-Western Nigeria, where he had his primary and secondary school education. He proceeded to The Polytechnic, Ibadan where he graduated with a National Diploma in Mass Communication; and later studied Cinematography, Editing and set design at the Independent Television Producers Association of Nigeria training school in 2001.

Career

Modelling
Prior to being employed by Supersport, Mozez was an active model. He commercially modelled for some reputable fashion houses in Nigeria including Modella where he worked for two years before he moved to South Africa.

Supersport
Mozez is one of the pioneering members of Supersport in Nigeria. He was employed as Production Coordinator in 2007 into the company through the help of the head of production crew of a reality T.V show he took part in, in 2004. He currently anchors Naija Made, a DStv sports programme focused on the Nigeria Premier League.

Personal life
Mozez is married to his wife with whom they have two children. He is also a brand ambassador for MUDI Africa.

References

External links
 

Nigerian radio presenters
Living people
Nigerian male models
The Polytechnic, Ibadan alumni
Residents of Lagos
Year of birth missing (living people)